Don Luis Alberto Ferré Aguayo (February 17, 1904 October 21, 2003) was a Puerto Rican engineer, industrialist, politician, philanthropist, and a patron of the arts. He was the governor of Puerto Rico from 1969 to 1973. He was the founder of the New Progressive Party, which advocates for Puerto Rico to become a state of the United States of America. He is a recipient of the Presidential Medal of Freedom.

Early life
Luis Alberto Ferré Aguayo was born in the southern city of Ponce, Puerto Rico on February 17, 1904. Ferré's grandfather Maurice Ferré Perotín was a French engineer who was involved in the construction of the Panama Canal before settling in Cuba. Ferré's father, Antonio Ferré Bagayado or "Bacallao", was born in Havana, Cuba and grew up there. As a young man he immigrated to Puerto Rico, where he founded the company Puerto Rico Iron Works, in Barrio Playa de Ponce, Ponce, Puerto Rico. In Puerto Rico, Antonio Ferré met and married María Aguayo Casals, a cousin of both Catalan cellist Pablo Casals (whose mother was a Puerto Rico-born Catalan musician) and Carmelita Defilló Sanz (wife to Dominican politician and historian Manuel Arturo Peña Batlle and mother of Dominican paintist Fernando Peña Defilló). Antonio and María had four sons, Luis, José, Carlos and Hermán Ferré, and two daughters, Rosario and Isolina, this latter would become a nun of international prominence.

Ferré studied mechanical engineering at the Massachusetts Institute of Technology, obtaining his bachelor's degree in 1924 and master's degree in 1925, and music at the New England Conservatory of Music. During this time while living in Boston, Ferré developed an admiration for the "American way of democracy".

Industrialist
Upon his return to Puerto Rico, Ferré helped transform his father's company into a successful business from which he earned a fortune. In 1948, he acquired El Día, a fledgling newspaper that was later renamed El Nuevo Día, becoming the newspaper with the largest circulation in Puerto Rico at the time. In the 1950s, Ferré's Empresas Ferré (Ferre Enterprises) acquired Puerto Rico Cement and Ponce Cement, which capitalized on the economic boom which Puerto Rico enjoyed based on the ambitious industrialization projects undertaken in association with the Operation Bootstrap. Ferré's  brother, José, had moved to Miami with his family. His son Maurice expanded a successful business there, selling bagged pre-mixed cement and sand under the name Mezcla Lista. Maurice Ferré was elected Mayor of Miami.

Political life
Ferré became active in politics in the 1940s. He unsuccessfully ran for mayor of Ponce in 1940 and Resident Commissioner of Puerto Rico in 1948.

Representative
In 1948, Puerto Ricans were allowed to elect their governor; previously the position was filled by appointment by the United States president. Luis Muñoz Marín was elected governor of Puerto Rico. A movement began which aimed to adopt a commonwealth relationship with the United States of America. In 1951, a referendum was held to decide whether to approve or not the option granted by the United States Congress to draft Puerto Rico's first constitution.  Ferré abstained from participating in the process; the pro-statehood party to which he belonged favored the 1951 referendum. He believed that the process would mean "an acceptance of a colony and condemn the people to a perpetual condition of second class citizenship". Ferré later participated in the constitutional assembly created by the referendum, which drafted the constitution.

In 1952 the Constitution of Puerto Rico was adopted, renaming the body politic of the territory of Puerto Rico as the Commonwealth of Puerto Rico. Ferré was elected as a member of the Constitutional Assembly. That same year Ferré was elected representative in the Puerto Rico House of Representatives. He ran under the Republican Statehood Party ("Partido Estadista Republicano) and officially assumed his duties as representative on January 11, 1953.

Governor and Senator
On July 23, 1967, a plebiscite was held to decide if the people of Puerto Rico desired to become an independent nation, a state of the United States of America, or continue the commonwealth relation established in 1952. The majority of Puerto Ricans opted for the Commonwealth option (see Puerto Rican status referendums). Disagreement within the then pro-statehood party headed by Miguel A. García Méndez led Ferré and others to found the New Progressive Party (a.k.a., PNP).

In the following general election in 1968, Ferré ran for Governor and defeated Luis Negrón López, the candidate of the Popular Democratic Party (PPD) by a slight margin. The ruling party had split with the creation of the People's Party, which ran incumbent PDP-elected Governor Roberto Sánchez Vilella as its gubernatorial candidate,  ending Luis Muñoz Marín's PPD's hold on the governor's seat, which had lasted 20 years.

During Ferré's administration, Puerto Rico was in an economic boom at 7% GDP growth and the unemployment at 10%. His work as governor of Puerto Rico included defending the federal minimum wage and granting workers a Christmas bonus. He visited Puerto Rican troops in Vietnam. In 1970, his first wife, Lorencita, died at La Fortaleza after being bed-ridden for years. Their daughter, Rosario Ferré, an acclaimed novelist and writer, stepped into the role of First Lady.

During his governorship, he paid special attention to youth affairs and bringing young Puerto Ricans into public service.  He successfully had the Puerto Rico Constitution amended to lower the voting age to 18, strongly supported the New Progressive Party Youth organization as party president, and appointed then-young statehooders such as Antonio Quiñones Calderón and Francisco "Pompi" González to high-level administration jobs, campaigned for a 26-year-old at large House candidate, nominated a future Senate President and Secretary of State, teenager Kenneth McClintock as Puerto Rico delegate to the 1971 White House Conference on Youth, and strengthened college scholarship programs.

Before the Congress created the United States Environmental Protection Agency in 1971, Ferré had already created Puerto Rico's Environmental Quality Board in 1970, charged with protecting the islands' environment.

In the elections of 1972 he sought reelection but lost to Rafael Hernández Colón of the PPD.  The PPD had claimed that many corruption scandals (rather minor compared to similar ones in the various administrations following Ferré's) had been overlooked by the Ferré administration. A bloody student strike at the University of Puerto Rico at Río Piedras in 1971 had been neutralized by the Puerto Rican police using brute force, something about which Ferré had mixed feelings. Hernández played the youth card in his campaign (when elected he was the youngest Puerto Rican governor). All these issues, along with the reunification of the People's Party and the PDP, contributed to a PDP win over Ferré in the election.

Ferré remained active in politics and in 1976, he was elected to the Senate of Puerto Rico. Ferré served as the eighth president of the Senate from 1977 to 1981 and continued serving as senator until 1985.

Years after leaving La Fortaleza, he married Tiody De Jesús, a nurse who later became a physician.

After serving as senator, Ferré continued to be active in politics, especially representing the United States Republican Party on the island. Between 1989 and 1991, Ferré served with former Governor Carlos Romero Barceló, former representative Benny Frankie Cerezo, PNP leader Kenneth McClintock and former congressional staffer David Gerken as the New Progressive Party's negotiating team while Congress considered Puerto Rico political status legislation introduced by Senator J. Bennett Johnston.

Renaissance man

Ferré was also a talented pianist who recorded several albums of his piano music. On January 3, 1959 he founded the Museo de Arte de Ponce, in his hometown of Ponce. The museum initially displayed 71 paintings from his personal collection and today displays over 3,000 pieces. Among other things, Ferré is credited with having rescued from oblivion the painting Flaming June by the Victorian painter Frederic Lord Leighton – purchasing it in 1963, when it was considered "too old fashioned" and getting it prominently displayed at the Museo of Arte de Ponce.

, the center for performing arts in Santurce, Puerto Rico also bears his name, as well as the main highway connecting San Juan and Ponce. He also assisted in the creation of the Casals Festival  and the Puerto Rico Conservatory of Music. He was a member of Phi Sigma Alpha fraternity. As a sportsman, Ferré practiced fencing, and is honored annually with the "Campeonato Nacional de Esgrima" in Puerto Rico.

His philanthropic deeds and defense for democracy earned him the Presidential Medal of Freedom, awarded by President George H. W. Bush on November 18, 1991.

Death and legacy

On September 29, 2003, Ferré was hospitalized with a urinary tract infection and underwent surgery for an intestinal blockage on October 1. While in the hospital, he developed pneumonia before finally succumbing to respiratory failure on the morning of October 21, 2003. He was 99 years old.

His body lay in state in Puerto Rico's capitol building in San Juan, then transported to his museum in Ponce, before being taken for a state funeral and burial in that city. His funeral and ceremonies honoring him were attended by numerous politicians. He is interred at the Las Mercedes Memorial Park in Ponce.

Among the awards that were bestowed on Luis A. Ferré was the Presidential Medal of Freedom, an honor which was also subsequently bestowed on his sister Sor Isolina Ferre.  The sculptor Tomás Batista was also commissioned to make a bust of Ferré, which is exhibited in the Ponce Museum of Art.  Another Tomás Batista bust of him was unveiled by his widow, Tiody, Senate President Kenneth McClintock and Senate Vice President Orlando Parga in February, 2008 at the Senate of Puerto Rico's Hall of Governors.

In 2004 the historic United States Courthouse and Post Office Building in Ponce, Puerto Rico was named the Luis A. Ferré United States Courthouse and Post Office Building by an Act of the U.S. Congress.

The segment of Las Américas Avenue that includes the Museo de Arte de Ponce and the Pontifical Catholic University of Puerto Rico was renamed the Luis A. Ferré Boulevard in November, 2010, in his honor.

See also

 Sor Isolina Ferré
 The Last Sleep of Arthur in Avalon
 List of Puerto Ricans – Governors
 List of political parties in Puerto Rico
 Politics of Puerto Rico
List of Puerto Rican Presidential Medal of Freedom recipients

References

External links

 White House Statement on Don Luis Ferre
  Centro de Bellas Artes Luis A. Ferre (Luis A. Ferre Center for the Performing Arts)
 Museo de Arte de Ponce (Ponce Art Museum)

|-

|-

|-

|-

|-

1904 births
2003 deaths
20th-century philanthropists
Deaths from respiratory failure
Governors of Puerto Rico
Industrialists from Ponce
Infectious disease deaths in Puerto Rico
MIT School of Engineering alumni
Members of the Senate of Puerto Rico
New England Conservatory alumni
New Progressive Party members of the House of Representatives of Puerto Rico
Philanthropists from Ponce
Politicians from Ponce
Presidential Medal of Freedom recipients
Presidents of the New Progressive Party (Puerto Rico)
Presidents of the Senate of Puerto Rico
20th-century Puerto Rican businesspeople
20th-century Puerto Rican engineers
Puerto Rican party leaders
Puerto Rican people of Catalan descent
Republican Party (Puerto Rico) politicians
Republican Party governors of Puerto Rico
Statehood movement in Puerto Rico
Burials at Cementerio Las Mercedes
20th-century Puerto Rican politicians